West Ulverstone is a locality and suburb of Ulverstone in the local government area of Central Coast, in the North West region of Tasmania. The Bass Highway passes through from south-east to north-west. The Leven River forms the eastern and most of the southern boundary. The 2021 census determined a population of 4515 for the state suburb of West Ulverstone. The Central Coast Council has recently redeveloped the area to increase tourism. 2010 saw the completion of a new basketball stadium, the Schweppes Arena. The arena holds around 1,100 people, cost $5.5 million to build and was completed just behind schedule. it overlooks the River Leven and is situated just behind the former stadium.

History
The name Ulverstone is believed to be derived from Ulverston in England.

Road infrastructure
The C142 route (South Road) terminates at the Bass Highway in West Ulverstone. It runs east through the locality and then further east before rejoining the Bass Highway in Ulverstone.

References

Localities of Central Coast Council (Tasmania)
Towns in Tasmania
Ulverstone, Tasmania